Coptacra is the type genus of grasshoppers in the subfamily Coptacrinae (family Acrididae). Species can be found in tropical Asia.

Species
The Catalogue of Life lists:
Coptacra angulata Rehn, 1905
Coptacra ensifera Bolívar, 1902
Coptacra foedata (Serville, 1838) - type species (as Acridium foedatum Serville)
Coptacra formosana Tinkham, 1940
Coptacra hainanensis Tinkham, 1940
Coptacra lafoashana Tinkham, 1940
Coptacra longicornis Balderson & Yin, 1987
Coptacra minuta Bey-Bienko, 1968
Coptacra nigrifemura Wei & Zheng, 2005
Coptacra punctoria Walker, 1870
Coptacra taiwanensis Zhang & Yin, 2002
Coptacra tonkinensis Willemse, 1939
Coptacra tuberculata Ramme, 1941
Coptacra xiai Yin, Ye & Yin, 2011
Coptacra yunnanensis Zhang & Yin, 2002

References

External links

Acrididae genera
Orthoptera of Asia
Orthoptera of Indo-China